Jule Berndt (April 18, 1924 – December 7, 1997) was an American Lutheran clergyman and politician.

Born in Oshkosh, Wisconsin, Berndt attended Winneconne High School, in Winneconne, Wisconsin, and then served in the United States Army Air Forces during World War II as a navigator. He received his bachelor's degree from the University of Wisconsin and his master's degree in theology from Wartburg Theological Seminary. He married Lois Kroeschel and had two children, Leah and Bill. Berndt was pastor of Lutheran Churches in Milwaukee, Sturgeon Bay, Eau Claire, and River Falls, Wisconsin. He served in the Wisconsin State Assembly in 1981 as a Republican, while living in River Falls, Wisconsin. He died in River Falls.

References

1924 births
1997 deaths
Politicians from Oshkosh, Wisconsin
People from River Falls, Wisconsin
United States Army Air Forces officers
University of Wisconsin–Madison alumni
Wartburg Theological Seminary alumni
20th-century American Lutheran clergy
Republican Party members of the Wisconsin State Assembly
20th-century American politicians
United States Army Air Forces personnel of World War II
Military personnel from Wisconsin